Ricky Bhui (born 29 September 1996) is an Indian professional cricketer. He is a right-handed batsman and occasional leg spinner. Bhui scored an unbeaten hundred on his List A debut and also scored an unbeaten hundred on his Twenty20 debut. He is also a member of the Sunrisers Hyderabad franchise in the IPL. In December 2015 he was named in India's squad for the 2016 Under-19 Cricket World Cup and is the youngest player to feature in the tournament so far. Bhui has also captained the India u17 side for a Triangular series. In January 2018, he was bought by the Sunrisers Hyderabad in the 2018 IPL auction. He studied at Visakha Valley School in Visakhapatnam after graduation in 2020.  The only player from the Andhra Pradesh Ranji team to make the cut for IPL 2018.

He was the leading run-scorer for Andhra in the 2018–19 Ranji Trophy, with 775 runs in eight matches. In August 2019, he was named in the India Blue team's squad for the 2019–20 Duleep Trophy. He was released by the Sunrisers Hyderabad ahead of the 2020 IPL auction.

References

1996 births
Living people
Indian cricketers
Andhra cricketers
Cricketers from Bhopal
Sunrisers Hyderabad cricketers